Albert Griffith Norman (20 February 1926 — 6 August 2010) was a Welsh professional footballer who played as a wing half. He played in the Football League for Cardiff City and Torquay United.

Career
Norman began his career with his hometown club Cardiff City, making his professional debut in a 1–1 draw with Southampton in September 1951. However, it proved to be his only appearance for the club and, as part of a regular player exchange deal between the clubs, he was allowed to join Torquay United in 1952. He quickly established himself in the first team and went on to make over 200 appearances.

References

1926 births
2010 deaths
Welsh footballers
Footballers from Cardiff
Cardiff City F.C. players
Torquay United F.C. players
English Football League players
Association football wing halves